Approval may refer to:

 Approval rating, a polling term which reflects the approval of a particular person or program
 Approval voting, a voting system
 Approval proofer, an output device used in Prepress proofing
 Approved drug, formal government approval of a medication for sale
 Social approval, the positive appraisal and acceptance of a person by a social group